Gong Hyo-jin (born April 4, 1980) is a South Korean actress. She is best known for her leading role in the film Crush and Blush (2008), as well as for her popular television series Sang Doo! Let's Go to School (2003), Thank You (2007), Pasta (2010), The Greatest Love (2011), Master's Sun (2013), It's Okay, That's Love (2014), The Producers (2015), Don't Dare to Dream (2016), and When the Camellia Blooms (2019). She is considered to be the queen of romantic comedies due to her successful portrayals in her rom-com dramas.

Film

Television series

Variety show

Music video appearances

Theater

References 

South Korean filmographies